In the 1859 Chicago mayoral election, incumbent Republican John Charles Haines defeated Democratic challenger Marcus D. Gilman.

The election was held on March 1.

Results

References

1859
Chicago
1859 Illinois elections
1850s in Chicago